The following is a list of mayors of the city of Kremenchuk, Ukraine. It includes positions equivalent to mayor, such as chairperson of the city council executive committee.

Mayors 

 , 1900–1903, 1906–1908, 1916–1917
 Gusev Pavlo Hryhorovych, 1909, 1911-1916
 , 1917
 Smirnov Dmitry Petrovich, 1918
 Bromberg Moses Akimovich, 1918
 Vyazmitinov Mykola Oleksandrovych, 1918
 Boguslavsky Mikhail Solomonovich, 1919
 , 1920
 Serbichenko Alexander Kalistratovich, 1920-1922
 , 1927
 Kaptsevich Alexander Savich, 1928-1929
 Fusik Fedor Alekseevich, 1934-1935
 Lagno Hryhoriy Stepanovych, 1940-1941
 Stoletsky Alexander Ivanovich, 1941
 , 1943-1945
 Gavrilov Mykola Dmitrovich, 1945-1949
 Violinist Dmitry Petrovich, 1949-1961
 Kozharin Mykhailo Oleksiiovych, 1962-1970
 Matvienko Victor Vasilyevich, 1970-1979
 , 1979-1980
 Verbin Anatoliy Vasyliovych, 1980-1986
 Litvinenko Anatoliy Kuzmich, 1986-1990
 Balanyuk Victor Nikolaevich, 1990
 , 1990–1994, 1995-1998
 Bilan Leonid Nikolaevich, 1994-1995
 , 1998-2000
 , 2000-2010
 , 2010-2014
 Kalashnik Victor Vasilyevich, 2014-2015
 , 2015-

See also
 Kremenchuk history
 History of Kremenchuk (in Ukrainian)

References

This article incorporates information from the Ukrainian Wikipedia.

External links

History of Poltava Oblast
Kremenchuk